Shenzhen Kangtai Biological Products, also known as BioKangtai, is a Chinese biopharmaceutical company that develops, manufactures and markets vaccines and other vaccine products.

Kangtai develops the Minhai COVID-19 vaccine and has the exclusive right to manufacture the Oxford–AstraZeneca COVID-19 vaccine in mainland China.

References

Pharmaceutical companies of China
Manufacturing companies based in Shenzhen
Biotechnology companies of China
Biopharmaceutical companies
COVID-19 vaccine producers
Chinese companies established in 1992
Chinese brands
Biotechnology companies established in 1992
Medical research
Holding companies of China